Howard Township is a township in Wayne County, Iowa, USA.

History
Howard Township is named for Tilghman Howard.

References

Townships in Wayne County, Iowa
Townships in Iowa